The Suite Life of Karan & Kabir is a Disney Channel India Sitcom, which premiered between 8 April 2012 to 18 August 2013. The series is an Indian adaptation of the American show The Suite Life of Zack & Cody.

Starring Siddharth Thakkar, Namit Shah, Shivshakti Sachdev, Tara Sutaria, Damman Baggan and Shruti Seth, the series is set in the Raj Mahal Hotel in Mumbai and centers on Karan and Kabir, trouble-making twins who live there. Other main characters include Vinnie, the intelligent candy-counter girl; Rani Oberoi, the wealthy daughter of the hotel's owner; Preeti, the hotel's assistant manager and mother of twins Karan & Kabir; and the hotel's aggressive manager, Mr. Maan Singh.

Plot 
The show follows Karan and Kabir, twin brothers who live in Raj Mahal Hotel (a parody of Hotel Taj) in Mumbai with their mother, Preeti Jaiswal, the assistant manager in the hotel, and a talented singer. Similar to its parent series, The Suite Life of Zack & Cody, the series depicts the antics and mischief the boys are constantly up to, as well as the adventures of Rani Oberoi, the privileged and ditzy heiress of the Oberoi business, Vineeta or Vinnie, the candy-counter girl, and Mr. Maan Singh, the strict and dutiful manager who often acts as a foil to Karan and Kabir's schemes. The lazy housekeeper Shobha ji, the innocent bellboy Jang Bahadur, and the electrician "Digital" appear as supporting characters, along with the boys' friends Max and Noodle.

Cast and characters

Main 
Siddharth Thakkar as Karan Jaiswal: Karan is typically a self-centered, non-studious, outgoing, immature boy. He is 10 minutes older than his twin Kabir. He is the equivalent of Zack Martin in The Suite Life of Zack & Cody.
Namit Shah as Kabir Jaiswal: Kabir is the kind, generous, and smarter twin brother. He is less adventurous but always gets into his brother Karan's antics, mostly accidentally, often leading to trouble. He is the equivalent of Cody Martin in The Suite Life of Zack & Cody.
Shivshakti Sachdev as Rani Uberoi: Rani Uberoi is the only daughter of the owner of the Raj Mahal Hotel where the twins live. Rani is a rich teenager with her own private suite at the hotel. She is the equivalent of London Tipton in The Suite Life of Zack & Cody.
Tara Sutaria as Vinita "Vinnie" Mishra (season 1): She is the teenage candy-counter girl at the Raj Mahal Hotel, who also works as a babysitter for Karan and Kabir. Vinnie is the equivalent to Maddie Fitzpatrick in The Suite Life of Zack & Cody.
Ayesha Kaduskar as Binnie Kukreja (season 2): In season 2 the character of "Vinnie" was replaced by "Binnie". The name and character's background is changed though the character is entirely similar. 
Shruti Seth as Priti Jaiswal: She is the single mother of Karan and Kabir, who also works as the assistant manager at the Raj Mahal Hotel. She is the equivalent of Carey Martin in The Suite Life of Zack & Cody.
Damandeep Singh Baggan as Mr. Maan Singh: He is the manager of the Raj Mahal Hotel, who speaks with a large vocabulary and urbane vernacular and is often annoyed by Karan and Kabir's schemes. He is the equivalent of Mr. Marion Moseby in The Suite Life of Zack & Cody.
Shaynam Ladakhi as Jang Bahadur: He is the bell-boy of the hotel, and an honest hard worker who is always ready to help anyone and often helps the boys in their mischief but ends getting scolded by Maan Singh who orders him to do overtime as a punishment. He is the equivalent of Esteban Ramirez in The Suite Life of Zack & Cody.

Recurring
Vrajesh Hirjee as Digital (Season 1): He is the hotel engineer. He is constantly inventing new things which mostly fail and make trouble. He is the equivalent of Arwin.
Farzil Pardiwalla as Toolkit (Season 2): The character "Digital" was replaced by Toolkit in season 2.
Sulakshana Khatri as Shobha Ji: She is a 60-year-old hotel employee who doesn't like to work for long. She is the equivalent of Muriel.
Abbas Syed as Vibhishan: He is the Restaurant Manager at the Raj Mahal Hotel whose name is often forgotten by the staff members. He is a equivalent of Patrick. 
Saniya Anklesaria as Max: She is one of Karan and Kabir's friends. She is the equivalent of Max in The Suite Life of Zack & Cody.
 Sahil Chauhan as Danzo: He is Karan and Kabir's school friend but also bullies other kids. Karan and Kabir both want to be in his gang once and invite him and his gang to their hotel. He is the equivalent to a one-time character named Drew who appeared in the first episode of The Suite Life of Zack and Cody.
 Armaan Malik as Zafar Ali

Episodes

Series overview

Season 1 (2012)

Season 2 (2013)

References

External links 

2012 Indian television series debuts
2013 Indian television series endings
Disney Channel (Indian TV channel) original programming
The Suite Life series
Indian television series based on American television series
Television series by Disney
Indian teen sitcoms
Hindi language television sitcoms
Television shows set in Mumbai
Television series about children
Television series about twins